Emilio Correa (born May 21, 1953) is a Cuban former amateur boxer who won welterweight gold at the Olympics 1972. He is not to be confused with his middleweight namesake, who is actually his son.

Inspired by his compatriots Roberto Caminero "Chocolatico" Pérez, Enrique Regüeiferos, Félix Betancourt and Rolando Garbey who also hail from Santiago de Cuba, he started boxing in 1966.

At the PanAm Games in Cali, Colombia (1971) he won gold against American Larry Carlisle, but it was not until he beat Betancourt at the national championships in 1972 that he was able to secure his ticket to the Olympics.

There he knocked out defending champion Manfred Wolke and beat the rest on points to win the first Cuban welterweight gold.

1972 Olympic results
Below is the record of Emilio Correa, a Cuban welterweight boxer who competed at the 1972 Munich Olympics:
 
Round of 64: bye
Round of 32: Defeated Damiano Lassandro (Italy) by decision, 5-0
Round of 16: Defeated Manfred Wolke (East Germany) by technical knockout in the second round
Quarterfinal: Defeated Günther Meier (West Germany) by decision, 3-2
Semifinal: Defeated Jesse Valdez (United States) by decision, 3-2
Final: Defeated János Kajdi (Hungary) by decision, 5-0 (won gold medal)

In 1974 Correa became the inaugural world champion at welterweight by knocking out American Clinton Jackson.

From 1973 to 1976 he defended his national title and in 1977 won the national junior middleweight title.

Internationally Correa didn't have much success after 1974.
At the PanAm Games in Ciudad de México (1975) he lost a decision to Jackson.

At the Olympics 1976 he lost inside the distance to Venezuelan Pedro Gamarro.
1st round bye
Defeated Plamen Yankov (Bulgaria) RSC 2
Lost to Pedro Gamarro (Venezuela) RSC 3

He fought his last fight winning the junior middleweight title in 1979.

References
Spanish article
databaseOlympics, different birth date
 

Living people
Welterweight boxers
1953 births
Sportspeople from Santiago de Cuba
Olympic boxers of Cuba
Olympic gold medalists for Cuba
Boxers at the 1972 Summer Olympics
Boxers at the 1976 Summer Olympics
Olympic medalists in boxing
Cuban male boxers
AIBA World Boxing Championships medalists
Medalists at the 1972 Summer Olympics
Boxers at the 1971 Pan American Games
Boxers at the 1975 Pan American Games
Pan American Games gold medalists for Cuba
Pan American Games bronze medalists for Cuba
Pan American Games medalists in boxing
Medalists at the 1971 Pan American Games
Medalists at the 1975 Pan American Games
20th-century Cuban people